Mellitus was the third Archbishop of Canterbury in the early 7th century AD.

Mellitus may also refer to:
 Diabetes mellitus, a metabolic disease
 Pachybrachis mellitus, a leaf-beetle species of Pachybrachis
 Neoporus mellitus, a predaceous water beetle in the family Dytiscidae
 Pyrophorus mellitus, a click beetle species of Pyrophorus
 Eumellitiphis mellitus, a bee mite in the family Laelapidae